Chihia is a town and commune in the Sfax Governorate, Tunisia. As of 2004 it had a population of 23,625.

See also
List of cities in Tunisia

References

Populated places in Sfax Governorate
Communes of Tunisia
Tunisia geography articles needing translation from French Wikipedia